GQT may refer to:

 Gardeners' Question Time, a long-running BBC Radio 4 programme
 Goodrich Quality Theaters, an American cinema chain